James Fron "Sonny" Throckmorton (born April 2, 1941) is an American country music singer and songwriter. Known primarily for his songwriting, Throckmorton has had more than 1,000 of his songs recorded by various country singers. He has also had minor success as a recording artist, having released two major-label albums: The Last Cheater's Waltz in 1978 on Mercury Records and Southern Train in 1986 on Warner Bros. Records. Throckmorton is a member of the Nashville Songwriters' Hall of Fame, and has been awarded Songwriter of the Year by both Broadcast Music Incorporated and the Nashville Songwriters Association International.

Biography
Throckmorton was born in Carlsbad, New Mexico, although his family soon moved to Wichita Falls, Texas. He moved to San Francisco, California after graduating from college, and first played rock & roll before switching his focus to country music at record producer Pete Drake's suggestion. By 1964, he played bass guitar for Carl Butler and Pearl, and had been signed to a publishing contract; his first hit as a songwriter was "How Long Has It Been", which was a Top Ten country hit for Bobby Lewis. Throckmorton was later signed to a contract with Sony/Tree Publishing, but was fired after none of his songs became hits.

Throckmorton returned to Texas in 1975. However, other songwriters had continued selling his songs, and he was soon re-hired by Tree Publishing. Over 150 of his songs were recorded in only nine months, including Johnny Duncan's first Number One hit, "Thinking of a Rendezvous". Other artists who had hits with his songs included John Conlee, Dave & Sugar, Merle Haggard, The Oak Ridge Boys, and Jerry Lee Lewis. Throckmorton was also signed to a recording contract with Mercury Records in 1976, although none of the singles from his debut album The Last Cheater's Waltz reached Top 40. He was also named Songwriter of the Year by the Nashville Songwriters Association International in 1978, 1979 and 1980, as well as Songwriter of the Year by Broadcast Music Incorporated in 1980. Between 1976 and 1980, at least one of his songs appeared on the country charts almost every week, and overall, more than a thousand of his songs were recorded by country artists. Throckmorton's streak of songwriting continued into the 1980s and 1990s, with Mel McDaniel, George Strait and Doug Stone recording his material as well.

Throckmorton was inducted into the Nashville Songwriters Hall of Fame in 1985. Three years later, he signed to a second recording contract with Warner Bros. Records, releasing the album Southern Train but no singles. Throckmorton retired to his ranch in Texas in 1988 to care for his dying father.

In 2019 Willie Nelson recorded a version of Ride me back home by Sonny Throckmorton and also named his new album after it.

Discography

Albums
Last Cheater's Waltz (1978)
Southern Train (1986)

Singles

References

1941 births
American country singer-songwriters
American male singer-songwriters
Living people
People from Carlsbad, New Mexico
Singers from New Mexico
Songwriters from New Mexico